Ferris wheel is an Iranian Drama series. The series is directed by Aziz Allah Hamidnejad.

Storyline 
The main theme of the series is a moral concept that is repeated in each of the stories, and most of the actors are supporting characters at the beginning of each story, who become the main actor in the next story.

Cast 
 Behnaz Jafari
 Hamid Reza Azarang
 Alireza Jafari
 Asha Mehrabi
 Mehran Ahmadi
 Amir Aghaei
 Milad KeyMaram
 Leila Otadi
 Shabnam Moghaddami
 Keyhan Maleki
 Tarlan Parvaneh
 Shamsi Fazlollahi
 Setareh Hosseini
 Amin Zendegani
 Siavash Tahmoures
 Linda Kiani
 Hossein Soleimani
 Mina Jafarzadeh
Mohammad Kart
 Bahram Ebrahimi
 Farzaneh Neshatkhah
 Ehsan Emami
 Ghasem Zare
 Abbas Ghazali
 Maryam Bobani
 Mehrdad Ziaei
 Laleh Sabouri
 Andisheh Fouladvand
 Fataneh Malek Mohammadi
 Mojtaba Tabatabaei
 Fatemeh Shokri
 Amir Mohammad Zand
 Mehrdad Falahatgard
 Farhad Besharati
 Safa Aghajani
 Mohammad Reza Rahbari
 Fereshteh Sarabandi

References 

2010s Iranian television series
Iranian television series